Gianluca Catalano (born May 6, 2000) is a Canadian soccer player who plays as a goalkeeper for Vaughan Azzurri in League1 Ontario.

Youth career
He began playing soccer at age three with Kleinburg Nobleton SC. As a youth, he was a member of the TFC Academy. He represented Toronto FC at multiple youth international soccer tournaments in France, Mexico, USA, and at the world famous Torneo di Viareggio in Italy, where he helped the TFC Academy to a 1-1 draw against the Juventus Academy.  He later helped them defeat Juventus saving the final shot in a penalty shootout in the championship finals to win the 2017 International Youth Soccer Cup.

College career
In 2018, he accepted a scholarship to play for NCAA Division 1 University of Connecticut (UConn).  As a freshman, he started the season opener and won 2-1 vs Lehigh, advanced to the American Athletic Conference semi-finals, and lost to Indiana University in the 2nd round of the NCAA Division I Men's Soccer Tournament, also known as the College Cup.  As a sophomore in 2019, he was named Goalkeeper of the Week in October. On February 24, 2020, he was named to the FTF NCAA All-Canadian 1st Team.

Club career
He began his career in the semi-professional League1 Ontario playing for Toronto FC III and was selected to the 2017 League1 Ontario All-Star team.

He made his fully professional league debut for Toronto FC II in the USL Championship as an academy call-up, on May 16, 2018 against Atlanta United 2. He went on to play a total of 5 USL Championship games, including 4 starts, prior to joining UConn.

In the spring of 2019, he joined AC Connecticut of the USL League Two (USL2) making 66 saves in 9 games  and was named the number two goalkeeping prospect as part of the league's Top 20 Under 20.  On November 20, 2019, he was nominated by the league for the 'Global Greats Series': Best Player from North America 2019, where he finished 3rd overall in voting.

In 2022, he played for Vaughan Azzurri in League1 Ontario. Leading the team to a second consecutive undefeated League1 Premier Division regular season Championship as well as winning the Playoff Championship final which also qualified the team to the 2023 Canadian Championship.  He was named to the Gatorade team of the month for August, 2022.  He went on trial with Canadian Premier League club York United FC, ahead of the 2022 season. He served as an emergency substitute goalkeeper for York United during the season, and made a start for the club on July 1 against FC Edmonton.

International career
In October 2014, he made his debut in the Canadian youth program at an identification camp for the Canada U15 team. In 2015, he was named to the Canadian U-15 team, for a CONCACAF tournament in Mexico City. Later that same year, he was named to a U-18 development camp. In 2017, he was named to the Canadian U17 team for the 2017 CONCACAF U-17 Championship.

Career statistics

References

External links
 
 
 

2000 births
Living people
Association football goalkeepers
Canadian soccer players
Soccer players from Toronto
Toronto FC players
Toronto FC II players
UConn Huskies men's soccer players
USL Championship players
League1 Ontario players
USL League Two players
AC Connecticut players
York United FC players
Canada men's youth international soccer players
Vaughan Azzurri players